Agathagowdanahalli  is a village in the southern state of Karnataka, India. It is located in the Gundlupet taluk of Chamarajanagar district.

See also
 Chamarajanagar
 Districts of Karnataka

References

External links
 http://Chamarajanagar.nic.in/

Villages in Chamarajanagar district